Rhinophichthus penicillatus is a species of eel in the family Ophichthidae.  It is the only member of its genus.  It is known only in the Pacific Ocean in the vicinity of New Caledonia.

References

Ophichthidae
Fish described in 1999